Nagaland Board of School Education (abbreviated as NBSE) is a board of school education in the state of Nagaland, India. NBSE is a state agency of Government of Nagaland in India, and is responsible for the promotion and development of secondary and higher secondary education in Nagaland.

Objectives

The Nagaland Board of School Education is basically instituted:
 To prescribe courses of instruction for examinations,
 To prescribe conditions of examinations, conduct examinations and be responsible for making necessary arrangements for the same,
 To publish the results of external examinations,
 To prepare the curricula, syllabus and textbooks in accordance with the approved courses of study.

Some of its functions are:

 To guide the State Government on development of school education - secondary and higher secondary level.
 To adopt reforms in examinations and evaluation practices.
 To inspect schools to ascertain attainment of standards.
 To organise seminars, workshops for teachers and heads of institutions.

See also
 Central Board of Secondary Education
 Indian Certificate of Secondary Education
 National Institute of Open Schooling

References

External links
 

1973 establishments in Nagaland
Government agencies established in 1973
State secondary education boards of India
Government of Nagaland
Education in Nagaland